Kathleen Margaret Tiffen (15 July 1912 – May 1986) was a British hurdler. She competed in the women's 80 metres hurdles at the 1936 Summer Olympics.

References

1912 births
1986 deaths
Athletes (track and field) at the 1934 British Empire Games
Athletes (track and field) at the 1936 Summer Olympics
Athletes (track and field) at the 1938 British Empire Games
British female hurdlers
Olympic athletes of Great Britain
Place of birth missing